Perfect Wedding is a British play by Robin Hawdon which has been produced in over thirty different countries and twenty languages.

Characters 
RACHEL (The Bride)
BILL (The Groom)
TOM (The Best Man)
JUDY (A Girl)
JULIE (A Chamber-maid)
DAPHNE (The Bride’s Mother)

Productions

City Theatre, Brno, Czech Republic 

Directed by Stano Slovák in City Theatre in Brno. Translated by Jan Šotkovský. Video on Youtube. . The premiere had 27 March 2010. The play had 98 reprises.

Rachel - Svetlana Janotová-Slováková or Lenka Janíková
Bill - Milan Němec
Tom - Petr Štěpán
Judy - Hana Holišová
Julie - Lucie Zedníčková
Daphne - Jana Musilová or Ludmila Mecerodová
Dupont, director of hotel - Zdeněk Bureš

City Theatre, Zlín, Czech Republic 
Directed by Michaela Doleželová and Roman Vencl.

Bill - Marek Příkazký
Tom - Radovan Král
Rachel - Markéta Kalužíková
Julie - Marie Vančurová
Daphne - Tamara Kotrbová
Dupont - Zdeněk Julina
Judy - Vendula Nováková

Theatre U Hasičů, Prague 2, Czech Republic 
Directed by Lumír Olšovský. Music by Ondřej Ruml. 
Starring: Filip Tomsa / Michael Vykus / Michal Zelenka, Olga Lounová / Malvína Pachlová, Josef Hervert / Karel Heřmánek ml., Lilian Sarah Fischerová, Jana Trojanová, Vendulka Křížová / Simona Vrbická, David Vejražka.

Geva Theatre Center, Rochester, New York, USA 
Directed by Bruce Jordan. The premiere had 12 February.
Starring: Tom Coiner, Cary Donaldson, Brigitt Markusfeld, Kristen Mengelkoch, Kate Middleton, Teri Watts.

Market House Theatre, USA 
Directed by Michael Cochran. Opening in 11 September.

Bill - Shawn James
Rachel - Jessica Maynard
Julie - Katie Hamilton
Daphne - Melissa Gallip
Tom - Brian Johnson

Gompertz Theatre, Florida Studio Theatre 
Directed by Bruco Jordan. The premiere had 10 April. Review: .

Rachel - Faith Sandberg
Bill - Graham Stuart Allen
Judy - Jenny Strassburg
Tom - Daryl Embry
Julie - Kate Siepert
Daphne - Lisa McMillan

Gadahad (RBC) Theatre, USA 
Showtime: Tuesday, 5 July 2016 - Thursday, 7 July 2016.

Domino Theatre, USA 
Playing at the Baby Grand, 218 Princess St., until 20 Dec. with performances from Thursday to Saturday at 8 p. m.

Rachel - Jacqueline Cyr
Bill - Kevin Fox
Judy - Keri McPhail
Tom - Ilke Hincer
Julie - Maria Nativida
Daphne - Jane Baldock

Judy -Keri McPhail Tom -Ilke Hincer Julie -Maria NatividadDaphne -Jane Baldock

Actors Theatre of Indiana 
Directed by Judy Fitzgerald. "Perfect Wedding" closed on Sunday, 21 September 2008, but Actors’ Theatre of Indiana is having "An Evening to Remember" on 22 November 2008 at the Oak Hill Mansion in Carmel as its annual fundraiser.

Bill - Don Farrell
Judy - Christa Shoot
Rachel - Jamison Kay Garrison
Tom - Bradley Reynolds
Julie - Cynthia Collins
Daphne - Julie Dixon
Dupont - Tobin Strader

Vital Theater Company, New York City, New York, USA 
Directed by Teresa K. Pond. Preview 8 July 2009 and opened 12 July 2009. Closing date 2 August 2009.

Bill ... Matt Johnson
Rachel ... Amber Bela Muse
Judy ... Kristi McCarson
Tom ... Fabio Pires

Northcoast Repertory Theatre, USA 

Rachel - Amanda Schaar
Bill - Christopher M. Williams
Julie - Kelly McCue
Tom - Jason Maddy
Judy - Brenda Dodge
Daphne - Linda Van Zandt

References

External links 
Robin Hawdon Website
City Theatre, Brno (in Czech)
Northcoast Website

British plays
Comedy plays